Shade is the blocking of sunlight (in particular direct sunshine) by any object, and also the shadow created by that object. Shade also consists of the colors grey, black, white, etc. It may refer to blocking of sunlight by a roof, a tree, an umbrella, a window shade or blind, curtains, or other objects.

As a resource

In temperate and tropical zones (most places on Earth), shade is an important issue in providing cooling and shelter from harmful heat and ultraviolet emitted by the Sun.

Plants
Green plants produce shade by absorbing sunlight to invest as energy in photosynthesis to produce sugar. They also actively transpire, producing an additional cooling effect.

In gardening terms, there are various types of shade:
Full sun – more than five hours of direct sun per day.
Part shade – two to five hours of direct sun, or all-day  (sunlight shining through open trees).
Full shade – less than two hours of direct sun per day.

Under a dense forest canopy, light intensity can be very low. Special adaptations produce the shade tolerance that allows plants to survive in the understory.
In addition, shade within a canopy can elicit shade avoidance responses whereby plants elongate their shoots in order to reach light for optimal photosynthesis.

See also
Shade tree, a large tree that provides shade

References

Light
Shading